The 2005 Singer Sri Lankan Airlines Rugby 7s was the seventh year of the Singer Sri Lankan Airlines Rugby 7s tournament. Japan defeated South Korea 28 - 10 in the final of the Cup.

First round

Pool A

 40 - 00 
 26 - 5 
 10 - 5 

{| class="wikitable" style="text-align: center;"
|-
!width="200"|Teams
!width="40"|Pld
!width="40"|W
!width="40"|D
!width="40"|L
!width="40"|PF
!width="40"|PA
!width="40"|+/−
!width="40"|Pts
|-style="background:#ccffcc"
|align=left| 
|2||2||0||0||66||5||+61||6
|-style="background:#ccffcc"
|align=left| 
|2||1||0||1||10||45||-35||4
|-style="background:#fcc6bd"
|align=left| 
|2||0||0||2||10||36||-26||2
|}

Pool B

 21 - 12  Arabian Gulf
 7 - 5  Arabian Gulf
 24 - 05 

{| class="wikitable" style="text-align: center;"
|-
!width="200"|Teams
!width="40"|Pld
!width="40"|W
!width="40"|D
!width="40"|L
!width="40"|PF
!width="40"|PA
!width="40"|+/−
!width="40"|Pts
|-style="background:#ccffcc"
|align=left| 
|2||2||0||0||45||17||+28||6
|-style="background:#ccffcc"
|align=left| 
|2||1||0||1||12||29||-17||4
|-style="background:#fcc6bd"
|align=left|  Arabian Gulf
|2||0||0||2||17||28||−11||2
|}

Pool C

 26 - 00 
 37 - 07 
 59 - 00 

{| class="wikitable" style="text-align: center;"
|-
!width="200"|Teams
!width="40"|Pld
!width="40"|W
!width="40"|D
!width="40"|L
!width="40"|PF
!width="40"|PA
!width="40"|+/−
!width="40"|Pts
|-style="background:#ccffcc"
|align=left| 
|2||2||0||0||75||0||+75||6
|-style="background:#ccffcc"
|align=left| 
|2||1||0||1||37||33||+4||4
|-style="background:#fcc6bd"
|align=left| 
|2||0||0||2||7||96||−89||3
|}

Pool D

 26 - 12 
  22 - 7 
 57 - 0 

{| class="wikitable" style="text-align: center;"
|-
!width="200"|Teams
!width="40"|Pld
!width="40"|W
!width="40"|D
!width="40"|L
!width="40"|PF
!width="40"|PA
!width="40"|+/−
!width="40"|Pts
|-style="background:#ccffcc"
|align=left| 
|2||2||0||0||83||12||+71||6
|-style="background:#ccffcc"
|align=left| 
|2||1||0||1||34||33||+1||4
|-style="background:#fcc6bd"
|align=left| 
|2||0||0||2||7||79||-72||2
|}

Second round

Bowl

Plate

Cup

References

2005
2005 rugby sevens competitions
2005 in Asian rugby union
rugby sevens